N-Ethylpentylone (β-keto-ethylbenzodioxolylpentanamine, βk-ethyl-K, βk-EBDP, ephylone) is a substituted cathinone and stimulant drug which was developed in the 1960s.

It has been reported as a novel designer drug in several countries including the United Kingdom, South Africa, New Zealand, the United States, and Australia.  
In 2018, N-ethylpentylone was the most common drug of the cathinone class to be identified in Drug Enforcement Administration seizures.

Adverse effects 

N-Ethylpentylone has been reported to cause lethal heart palpitations and hallucinations. It has been linked to a number of overdose deaths and mass-casualty incidents, and has increasingly been mis-sold as MDMA.

Pharmacology 
N-Ethylpentylone is primarily a mixed norepinephrine reuptake inhibitor and dopamine reuptake inhibitor. It binds to transporters with IC50 values of 37 nM (dopamine transporter), 105 nM (norepinephrine transporter) and 383 nM (serotonin transporter). The methylenedioxy ring-substitution provides a higher potency at inhibiting serotonin reuptake than its analogue N-ethylpentedrone.

Animal studies 

In vivo studies in mice demonstrated that acute intraperitoneal administration of N-ethylpentylone induced an increase in locomotor activity, anxiolytic effects but also an aggressive behaviour as well as social exploration deficits. Repeated exposure to N-ethylpentylone induced hyperthermia, anorexia and rewarding effects. During withdrawal after repeated administration, depression-like symptoms, hyperlocomotion, and a decrease of social exploration were observed.

Legality
 In the United States, N-ethylpentylone is a Schedule I controlled substance since June 2018.
 In Taiwan, N-ethylpentylone is a controlled substance under Taiwan's Controlled Drugs Act since Dec 2017.

See also 
 5-Methylethylone
 Dipentylone
 Ethyl-K
 Eutylone
 Methylenedioxypyrovalerone (MDPV)
 N-Ethylhexedrone
 N-Ethylhexylone
 N-Ethylheptylone
 Pentylone
 Isohexylone

References 

Cathinones
Benzodioxoles
Designer drugs
Serotonin–norepinephrine–dopamine reuptake inhibitors